This article details the fixtures and results of the Myanmar national football team in 2000s.

Results and upcoming fixtures

2000

2002

2003

2004

2005

2006

unofficial matches

2007

unofficial matches

2008

unofficial matches

2009

References

2000s in Burmese sport
2000